Rebelde (English title: Rebel Rio!) is a Brazilian soap opera produced by RecordTV. Written by Margareth Boury, the show is inspired by the original work created by Cris Morena. It is a remake of the Mexican soap opera Rebelde.

The main cast is composed of Lua Blanco, Arthur Aguiar, Melanie Fronckowiak, Chay Suede, Sophia Abrahão and Micael Borges - six students in a school called "Elite Way" that form not only a close friendship, but a band.

Synopsis 
The Elite Way is one of the most renowned educational institutions in the country, where students have access to high-level education, practice elite sports and live in semi-boarding school. They live at the school from Monday to Friday and on weekends they return home. Despite the rather rigid scheme, the richer families of Rio de Janeiro make sure their children study at the Elite Way. This is the case of Alice, Roberta, Diego, Carla and Tomás, rebellious and impulsive teenagers, who will discover a common goal in music.

The idealist Pedro will join them, a fellow student like many others in the college, who will snatch hearts and change much in the daily life of the school. The coexistence of privileged children and scholarship recipients is precisely the trigger for much of the conflict between students.

Pedro just does not realize that when he gets to the Elite Way, he's going to fall madly in love with Alice, and she will be totally engrossed by him too. Their romance will have to overcome many obstacles, such as the secrets that surround their families and the envy of the pampered daughter of the director of the school, Pilar, who also falls in love with Pedro. In his early days in the new school, Pedro meets Roberta, Diego, Carla and Tomás. They do not immediately accept him, but in time they will become his best friends. The romances, conflicts, confusions, joys and adventures are not limited to what happens behind the walls of the college. When they go home on weekends, a lot happens.

Alice wants her father, Franco, to fall in love again. Roberta does not get along with her mother, Eva, a famous singer who has always treated her as a younger sister. Diego would like his father, the powerful businessman Leonardo Maldonado, to pay more attention to him and so he will prepare the biggest confusions to attract attention. Heir to an immense fortune, Tomás finds himself with his relatives, his grandmother and two cousins, who only think about toasting all their money. And Carla, who dreams of being a dancer, is always around with her model sister, Becky, and out of anxiety, ends up eating more than she should.

Pedro returns to his new home in Rio de Janeiro, a modest house in the suburb, where he lives with his mother Beth and his brother Raul. It is in this same district, the Vila Lene. There lives other characters: the maternal Teresa, owner of the school canteen; And the fun Genaro, a widower who runs with his daughter Cilene a lively restaurant that will be the band's first stage. There also lives the family of the teacher Lupi, a computer genius who has enriched the Internet; and the teacher Vicente, who transformed an old factory into a modern youth republic.

Since losing his father when he was 13, Pedro lives for his mother and his brother. But now that he has moved to Rio, he is eager for change and news, wanting to live the fullness of his youth and rebellion, falling in love, singing, having fun and also unraveling a mystery: the motives of his father's death, which involve just the father of the girl he loves – Alice.

Despite the adversities and everything that separates them, Alice, Pedro, Roberta, Diego, Carla and Tomás will be united by the passion for music and the dream of living now as if there were no tomorrow. With much rebelliousness, they will revolutionize their lives and that of many people in their path.

Soundtrack

Rebelde is the soundtrack of the Brazilian the same name, released in 2012 by EMI. It was inspired by the telenovela Mexican the same name Rebelde  (2004-2006), created by Pedro Damián, In addition to the composer track for the actors of the novel, a parallel soundtrack was shown until the band Rebeldes was formed, with important names like Adriana Calcanhotto, singing the theme of Roberta and Diego (Lua Blanco and Arthur Aguiar), Diego Moraes, singing the theme of Vila Leme and Luiza Possi, singing the theme of Eva Messi. Also participating are singers of the casting of Rede Record, such as Hellen Lyu, singing the theme of Pilar, and Octávio Cardozzo, singing the theme of Jonas. The band Rebeldes already has its own portal. In the plot, the creator of the site is the character Téo, and the logo of the band was designed by Alice, interpreted by Bernardo Falcone and Sophia Abrahão.

Cast

Main cast

Recurring cast

The music group Rebeldes

Parallel to the fictional band created the rebels with the protagonists of the series: Lua Blanco (Roberta), Sophia Abrahão (Alice), Mel Fronckowiak (Carla), Arthur Aguiar (Diego), Chay Suede (Tomás) and Micael Borges (Pedro). They interpreted the main themes of fiction that were heard during the episodes.

The band had great success thanks to the good ratings of the series in Brazil, where it was displayed.

Awards and nominations

International release

References 

RecordTV telenovelas
2011 telenovelas
2011 Brazilian television series debuts
2012 Brazilian television series endings
Brazilian telenovelas
Children's telenovelas
Teen telenovelas
Brazilian television series based on Mexican television series
Television series about teenagers
Television series by Televisa
Portuguese-language telenovelas